Bernard Lugan (born 10 May 1946) is a French historian who specialises in African history. He is a professor at the Institut des hautes études de défense nationale (IHEDN) and the editor of the journal L'Afrique réelle ("Real Africa"). Lugan previously taught at Jean Moulin University Lyon 3 and at the special military school of Saint-Cyr until 2015. He served as an expert witness for Hutu defendants involved in the Rwandan genocide at the International Criminal Tribunal for Rwanda. Close to the far-right, Lugan is a self-declared monarchist and right-wing anarchist.

Early life and education 
Bernard Lugan was born in Meknes on 10 May 1946. During the May 1968 events, he was the head of Action Française's security personnel. Lugan attended Paris X University Nanterre and earned a PhD in history in 1976 after a thesis on Rwandan economy in the 19th century.

Academic career 
Lugan moved to Africa in the early 1970s where he conducted archaeological research in Rwanda. The results were published in Études Rwandaises and Tervuren between 1978 and 1983. From 1972, he taught African history at the National University of Rwanda. In June 1982, Lugan left Rwanda and became an Associate Professor of African history at Jean Moulin University Lyon 3.

In 1983, Lugan authored another thesis for a state doctorate, Between the servitudes of the hoe and the spells of the cow: the rural world in ancient Rwanda. In 1988, he received the M. et Mme Louis Marin prize from the Académie Française for his book The French People Who Made South Africa. In September 1993, he founded the review L'Afrique Réelle, which has been described as a supporter of "Boers-Afrikaners" in South Africa. Lugan has also been involved with far-right news outlets like Minute,  or Présent, which regard him as a specialist of African history. Until 2006, he hosted a talk show on Radio Courtoisie named the Libre Journal.

Lugan served as a Professor at the military school of Saint-Cyr until 2015, when his class was suspended at the request of the French Defence Ministry. He is now teaching at the Institut des Hautes Études de Défense Nationale (IHEDN).

International Criminal Tribunal for Rwanda 
Following the Rwandan genocide of 1994, Lugan served an expert witness at the International Criminal Tribunal for Rwanda. He was cited by several Hutu defendants ultimately convicted for their involvement in the genocide, including Théoneste Bagosora, Tharcisse Renzaho and Emmanuel Ndindabahizi.

Although he does not deny the existence or downplay the figures of the genocide, Lugan controversially claims that the events were not "programmed" by the Hutu leadership, and that president Juvénal Habyarimana was not assassinated by Hutu extremists. In the 1990–2000s, several media and personalities have been condemned for libel for calling Lugan a "genocide denier" or a "supporter of apartheid". At the 2001 World Conference against Racism, Senegalese President Abdoulaye Wade publicly labelled Lugan's work a form of "intellectual racism" and accused him of minimizing the contributions of Black people to the history of Africa in his research.

Political involvement 
Lugan is a self-declared monarchist. When testifying at the International Criminal Tribunal for Rwanda, Lugan admitted that he is a right-wing anarchist, adding: "of musketeer leaning". He is in favour of the re-establishment of dueling for libel and public insult, and founded in 1990 with Vladimir Volkoff an association to promote this agenda.

In 2012–2013, Lugan was among the sponsors of TV Libertés, a far-right web TV. The organization held a colloquium with Renaud Camus, Charlotte d'Ornellas and Jean Raspail in April 2016. Lugan is also a member of the National Council of European Resistance, launched in November 2017 and presided by Renaud Camus.

Work 
Lugan's notable work includes several books on Southern Africa, Morocco and Rwanda including "History of South Africa", When Africa was German  and African Legacy, Solutions for a Community in Crisis where he describes how individualism hasn't replaced preexisting loyalties to clans, groups, and tribes.

In this book, he rejects what he calls "the victimization paradigm," which says colonial exploitation and the slave trade brought Africa to its knees, rejects solutions based on Western guilt and claim that a correct interpretation of history is necessary for Africans to "build a future on a more solid foundation" and save an African continent ravaged by famine, economic disaster and civil war. He notably proposes a redrawing of national African frontiers in accordance with ethnic groupings and promotes a new type of democracy, more rooted in those native groupings rather than on Western "one man one vote" system.

Bibliography

Le Safari du Kaiser, La Table Ronde, Paris, 1987, 231 p. 
Huguenots et Français : ils ont fait l'Afrique du Sud, La Table ronde, Paris, 1988, 296 p.
 History of South Africa, Garzanti Publishing, 1989, 1st éd. : Perrin, coll. « Vérités et légendes », Paris, 1986, 272 p.
 Afrique : l'histoire à l'endroit, Perrin, coll. « Vérités et légendes », 1989, 285 p.  Rééd. : 1996
 The Last Boer Commando: A French Volunteer in the Anglo-Boer War, 1900-1902, éd. du Rocher, 1989
 Villebois-Mareuil, le La Fayette de l'Afrique du Sud, éd. du Rocher, 1990
 When Africa was German, Jean Picollec, coll. « Documents dossiers », Paris, 1990, 267+16 p. 
 Afrique, bilan de la décolonisation, 1st éd. : Perrin, coll. « Vérités et légendes », Paris, 1991, 304 p. Rééd. : 1996
La Louisiane française : 1682-1804, Perrin, coll. « Vérités et légendes », Paris, 1994, 273 p. Titre alternatif : Histoire de la Louisiane française : 1682-1804
 Afrique : de la colonisation philanthropique à la recolonisation humanitaire, C. de Bartillat, coll. « Gestes », Étrépilly, 1995, 390 p.
 The French People Who Made South Africa, Bartillat, coll. « Gestes », Étrépilly, 1996, 430 p. 
Histoire du Rwanda : de la préhistoire à nos jours, Bartillat, Paris, 1997, 606 p.
La guerre des Boers : 1899-1902, éd. Perrin, Paris, 1998, 364+8 p.
History of Morocco, éd. Perrin et éd. Critérion, coll. « Pour l'histoire », Paris, 2000, 363 p. 
Atlas historique de l'Afrique des origines à nos jours, Éd. du Rocher, Paris, Monaco, 2001 (2nd ed. 2018), 268 p. 
Histoire de l'Égypte, des origines à nos jours, éd. du Rocher, Paris, Monaco, 2002, 290 p. 
Douze années de combats judiciaires (1990-2002), Lyon, Édition de l’Afrique réelle, s.d.
African Legacy; Solutions for a Community in Crisis, Carnot, 224p, 2003, .
Rwanda : le génocide, l'Église et la démocratie, éd. du Rocher, Paris et Monaco, 2004, 234 p. 
François Mitterrand, l'armée française et le Rwanda, éd. du Rocher, Paris, Monaco, 2005, 288 p. 
Rwanda. Contre-enquête sur le génocide, éd. Privat, 2007, 
Rwanda : un génocide en questions, Editions du Rocher, 2014, 
Osons dire la vérité à l'Afrique, Monaco-Paris, France, Éditions du Rocher, 2015, 224 p. 
Histoire de l'Afrique du Nord (Egypte, Libye, Tunisie, Algérie, Maroc) : Des Origines à nos jours, Éditions du Rocher, 736 p., 2016,

References

External links
 

1946 births
20th-century French historians
People from Meknes
Living people
Academic staff of the University of Lyon
Historians of Africa
French male writers
Far-right politics in France
People affiliated with Action Française
21st-century French historians
Academic staff of the National University of Rwanda
Historians of Rwanda